Rathdrum is a city in Kootenai County, Idaho, United States. The population was 6,826 at the 2010 census, up from 4,816 in 2000. It is part of the Coeur d'Alene Metropolitan Statistical Area, which includes the entire county. It is named after Rathdrum in Ireland.

Geography

Rathdrum is situated at the base of Rathdrum Mountain, which is part of the Selkirk Mountain Range.

History
In the 1800s the town was initially called Westwood in honor of one of the founders of the town, a Pony Express rider and rancher, Charles Wesley Wood, also known as "Wes." But in 1881 the postmaster in the town was informed by the federal government that the town would need to change its name since it was already taken by another town in the territory. A local businessman, Michael M. Cowley, recommended the name "Rathdrum" from County Wicklow in Ireland, his place of birth.

Near the end of the 19th century, the Northern Pacific Railway built its line westwards to Spokane and Rathdrum started to grow slowly. Until today, Rathdrum remains on the only regular railway line in Idaho, now owned by BNSF Railway; the Empire Builder of Amtrak travels through Rathdrum without stopping there.

Demographics

2010 census
As of the census of 2010, there were 6,826 people, 2,427 households, and 1,852 families residing in the city. The racial makeup of the city was 95.0% White, 0.2% African American, 1.1% Native American, 0.3% Asian, 0.1% Pacific Islander, 0.8% from other races, and 2.5% from two or more races. Hispanic or Latino of any race were 3.6% of the population.

There were 2,427 households, of which 42.5% had children under the age of 18 living with them, 57.4% were married couples living together, 13.6% had a female householder with no husband present, and 23.7% were non-families. 18.3% of all households were made up of individuals, and 5.6% had someone living alone who was 65 years of age or older.  The average household size was 2.81 and the average family size was 3.17.

In the city, the population was spread out, with 16.7% under the age of 20, 57.4% from 20 to 64, and 8.8% who were 65 years of age or older.  The median age was 32.3 years.  Females represented the majority of the population at 51.6%, with males in the minority at 48.4%.

See also
 Lakeland High School
 Hauser Refueling Facility

References

External links
  - City of Rathdrum
 Rathdrum Chamber of Commerce
 Lakeland Joint School District #272 - public schools
 FYI North Idaho.com - Rathdrum
 The Rathdrum Star - weekly newspaper

Cities in Kootenai County, Idaho
Cities in Idaho